The 1943–44 Gauliga Donau-Alpenland was the sixth season of the Gauliga Donau-Alpenland, formerly the Gauliga Ostmark, the first tier of football in German-annexed Austria from 1938 to 1945.

First Vienna FC won the championship and qualified for the 1944 German football championship, reaching the quarter-finals where it lost 3–2 to eventual winners Dresdner SC.

The Gauliga Ostmark and Gauliga Donau-Alpenland titles from 1938 to 1944, excluding the 1944–45 season which was not completed, are recognised as official Austrian football championships by the Austrian Bundesliga.

Table
The 1943–44 season saw two new clubs in the league, LSV Markersdorf an der Pielach and SK Amateure Steyr. Steyr withdrew from the league on 20 April 1944, had its record expunged and was relegated.

Results

References

External links
 Das Deutsche Fussball Archiv  Historic German league tables

Gauliga Ostmark seasons
Austria
Football
1943–44 in German football leagues